The 2002 African Cup of Nations Final was a football match that took place on 10 February 2002 at the Stade du 26 Mars in Bamako, Mali, to determine the winner of the 2002 African Cup of Nations, the football championship of Africa organized by the Confederation of African Football (CAF).

Cameroon won the title for the fourth time by beating Senegal 3–2 on penalties.

Match details

Details

References

Final
2002
2002
2002
Africa Cup of Nations Final 2002
February 2002 sports events in Africa
African
2001–02 in Senegalese football